Evansville is an unincorporated community in Monroe County, in the U.S. state of Missouri.

History
A post office called Evansville was established in 1872, and remained in operation until 1950. The community has the name of a railroad man, according to local history.

References

Unincorporated communities in Monroe County, Missouri
Unincorporated communities in Missouri